The Visayan blue fantail (Rhipidura samarensis) is a species of bird in the family Rhipiduridae.

It is endemic to the eastern Visayas (Philippines) : Bohol, Leyte and Samar. Its natural habitat is subtropical or tropical moist lowland forests.  It was previously conspecific with the Mindanao blue fantail.

References

Sánchez-González, L.A., and R.G. Moyle. 2011. Molecular systematic and species limits in the Philippine fantails (Aves: Rhipidura). Molecular Phylogenetics and Evolution 61: 290-299

Visayan blue fantail
Endemic birds of the Philippines
Fauna of the Visayas
Visayan blue fantail
Taxa named by Joseph Beal Steere